is a Japanese footballer currently playing as a defender for Cerezo Osaka.

Career statistics

Club
.

Notes

References

External links

2002 births
Living people
Japanese footballers
Association football defenders
J3 League players
Cerezo Osaka players
Cerezo Osaka U-23 players